The 4th Army Aviation Support Squadrons Group "Scorpione" is an Italian Army unit based at Viterbo Airport near Rome in Lazio. The squadrons group is part of the Italian army's army aviation and is assigned to the Army Aviation Support Brigade. The squadrons group provides 2nd-line maintenance, upgrade and test services for the CH-47F "Chinook" helicopters, Shadow 200 drones, and P180 Avanti II and Dornier 228 planes of the 1st Army Aviation Regiment "Antares", and to the army's flight simulators.

History 
On 15 June 1976 the 4th Army Light Aviation Repairs Unit was formed at the Viterbo Airport in Viterbo by expanding the existing Technical-Logistical CH-47C Team. The team had been formed by the 1st Army Light Aviation Repairs Unit to support the arrival of the first CH-47C "Chinook" helicopters. The unit consisted of a command, a command squadron, a supply section, an inspection and recovery section, an aircraft maintenance and repair section, a helicopter maintenance and repair section, and a subsystems repair section. The unit provided technical-logistical services for CH-47C helicopters of the 1st Army Light Aviation Grouping "Antares".

On 12 December 1989 the unit was granted its own flag by the President of the Italian Republic Francesco Cossiga. In 1990 the unit consisted of a command, an administration office, an aviation materiel office, a general services department, a technical department, and aircraft squadron. On 2 June 1993 the unit was renamed 4th Army Aviation Repairs Unit. On 1 September 1996 the unit was renamed 4th Army Aviation Support Regiment "Scorpione". In 2012 the regiment was assigned to the Army Aviation Support Command, which on 31 July 2019 was renamed Army Aviation Support Brigade. On the same date the regiment was reduced to 4th Army Aviation Support Squadrons Group "Scorpione".

Naming 
Since the 1975 army reform Italian army aviation units are named for celestial objects: support regiments are numbered with a single digit and named for one of the 88 modern constellations. As in 1996 the 4th Army Aviation Repairs Unit was supporting the 1st Army Aviation Regiment "Antares", which was named for Antares, the brightest star in the Scorpius constellation, the army decided to name the new 4th Army Aviation Support Regiment "Scorpione" to affirm the two regiments' relationship.

As the squadrons group was founded in the city of Viterbo the squadrons group's coats of arms first quarter depicts Viterbo's coat of arms.

Current Structure 
As of 2022 the 4th Army Aviation Support Squadrons Group "Scorpione" consists of:

  4th Army Aviation Support Squadrons Group "Scorpione", at Viterbo Airport
 Headquarters Unit
 Command and Logistic Support Squadron
 Maintenance Unit
 1st Repair Squadron
 2nd Repair Squadron
 Technical and Test Section
 Air-materiel Supply Section
 External Work Section
 Flight Squadron (AB206 helicopters)

See also 
 Army Aviation

External links
Italian Army Website: 4° Gruppo Squadroni Sostegno Aviazione dell'Esercito "Scorpione"

References

Army Aviation Regiments of Italy